"" is the national anthem of the Republic of San Marino. It was written by Federico Consolo, an Italian violinist and composer, and replaced "Giubilanti d'amore fraterno" as the national anthem in 1894. It is one of a few without official lyrics (along with the "Marcha Real" of Spain, the National Anthem of Bosnia and Herzegovina, and "Europe" of Kosovo) and is therefore simply called "Inno Nazionale" ("National Anthem"). It is regularly played in the streets of the City of San Marino by the musicians of the Sammarinese Armed Forces during national and religious festivals.

Giosué Carducci wrote the lyrics, which were never adopted and are not sung in official ceremonies. While they are occasionally performed in informal contexts and taught in school, they remain quite unpopular among the citizens.

Lyrics

Notes

References

External links

"Inno Nazionale", sanmarinosite.com

European anthems
National symbols of San Marino
Sammarinese music
National anthems
National anthem compositions in A-flat major